Rescue Raiders is an Apple II scrolling shooter published by Sir-Tech in 1984. It was designed by Arthur Britto and Greg Hale.

Gameplay
The game is played on a two-dimensional side-scrolling playfield, where two players start at main bases on opposing sides of the field. The player operates a Choplifter-esque helicopter defending a string of advancing units, which the player purchases throughout the game. The objective is to create and defend a force that can escort a van filled with explosives to the enemy base at the other end of the playing field.

Along the way a series of smaller bunkers act as obstacles by flying balloons which, when operating for the opposing team, will destroy the player helicopter (the cable will severely damage the helicopter). The bunkers may be taken over by delivering enough infantry units, which may reach the bunker either by walking all the way from a main base without being killed, or by being carried there more quickly in the player helicopter.

The helicopter begins with three weapons: heat-seeking missiles, machine guns, and bombs. As the game progresses, additional weaponry is introduced.

Reception
In 1996, Next Generation listed it as number 36 on their "Top 100 Games of All Time", citing the strategy required to succeed in the game.

Reviews
The V.I.P. of Gaming Magazine #5 (Sept./Oct., 1986)

Legacy
In 1991, Three-Sixty Pacific released Armor Alley, a recreation of Rescue Raiders for Mac OS and DOS which added four-player network support.

These games subsequently inspired Super Army War for the Game Boy Advance and its Nintendo DS sequel, Glory Days 2.

The game was remade (as "Armor Alley") by Scott Schiller: http://www.schillmania.com/armor-alley/

References

1984 video games
Apple II games
Apple II-only games
Helicopter video games
Real-time tactics video games
Horizontally scrolling shooters
Sir-Tech games
Video games developed in the United States
Single-player video games